Mark Harte (born 1979) is a Gaelic football manager and former player. His league and championship career at senior level with the Tyrone county team lasted three seasons from 2003 until 2005.

Career
Born in Ballygawley, County Tyrone, Harte was raised in a strong Gaelic football family. His father, Mickey Harte, played with the Tyrone senior team between 1975 and 1982 before later going on to become the team's most successful manager.

At club level Harte played with Errigal Ciarán and enjoyed much success. In 2002 he won an Ulster medal with the club, while he also won three county senior championship medals.

Harte made his debut on the inter-county scene when he was selected for the Tyrone minor team. An Ulster medal winner in 1997, he ended the season as an All-Ireland runner-up. Harte subsequently joined the Tyrone senior team, winning an All-Ireland medal in his final season in 2000. Three years later he was added to the senior panel. Over the course of the following three seasons Harte won two All-Ireland medals and one Ulster medal.

In retirement from playing, Harte became involved in team management and coaching. He has served as joint-manager of the Pomeroy Plunketts and Ballinderry Shamrocks club teams.

Harte has also worked in the media as a Gaelic football analyst for GAA Beo on TG4.

Honours

Player
Errigal Ciarán
Ulster Senior Club Football Championship (1): 2002
Tyrone Senior Football Championship (3): 1997, 2000, 2002

Tyrone
All-Ireland Senior Football Championship (2): 2003, 2005
Ulster Senior Football Championship (1): 2003
All-Ireland Under-21 Football Championship (1): 2000
Ulster Under-21 Football Championship (1): 2000
Ulster Minor Football Championship (1): 1997

Manager
Pomeroy Plunketts
Ulster Intermediate Club Football Championship (1): 2016
Tyrone Intermediate Football Championship (1): 2016

References

1979 births
Living people
Errigal Ciarán Gaelic footballers
Gaelic football managers
Gaelic games writers and broadcasters
Mark
Tyrone inter-county Gaelic footballers